Bartl is a given name and surname that may refer to

Surname
Daniel Bartl (born 1989), Czech association football player 
Franz Bartl (1915–1941), Austrian field handball player 
Jiří Bartl (born 1963), Czech association football player and manager
Leopold Bartl (1902–1980), German Wehrmacht officer during World War II
Zlata Bartl (1920–2008), Bosnian Croat scientist

Given name
Bartl Gensbichler (born 1956), Austrian alpine skier

Surnames from given names